Randy M. Robitaille (born October 12, 1975) is a Canadian former professional ice hockey player. He last played for HC Donbass of the Kontinental Hockey League. Robitaille has previously played for nine teams in the National Hockey League (NHL).

Playing career
Robitaille first attracted notice playing for the Ottawa Jr. Senators of the CJHL. While not drafted by an NHL team, he was, on the basis of his offensive totals, offered a scholarship at Miami University. After two solid seasons at Miami, he was signed by the Boston Bruins of the NHL on March 17, 1997. After playing one game straight out of college, he played the next two seasons for the Bruins' AHL affiliate, the Providence Bruins, while playing a few games for the Bruins in between. He even helped Providence to their first Calder Cup win in 1998–99 while winning the Les Cunningham Award as the league's MVP.

On June 25, 1999, the Bruins traded Robitaille to the Atlanta Thrashers for Peter Ferraro. His stay in Atlanta did not last long as they quickly traded him to the Nashville Predators for Denny Lambert on August 16, 1999. While in Nashville, he played mainly in the NHL, only having a few brief stints with the Milwaukee Admirals. In fact, he spent a whole season in the NHL during the 1999–2000 NHL season, a career first. However, following the 2000–01 NHL season, the Predators chose not to re-sign him.

The Los Angeles Kings signed him as a free agent on July 7, 2001. Midway through that season, he was claimed by the Pittsburgh Penguins off waivers on January 4, 2002. Although he played in Pittsburgh for two seasons, he would never play one complete season in the city, as they traded him to the New York Islanders on March 9, 2003 for a draft pick. He completed the season for the Islanders, they chose not to re-sign him, so he became an unrestricted free agent for the first time. On August 12, 2003, he signed a contract that returned him to the Atlanta Thrashers.

During the lockout, he played for Zurich of Nationalliga A, becoming the league's top scorer & league MVP beating out Joe Thornton & Rick Nash for both awards.  Also making his first substantial playoff appearance in five seasons. Following the ratification of the NHL Collective Bargaining Agreement, he again found himself with the Nashville Predators, having signed a contract with them on August 19, 2005. However, they assigned him to AHL on October 3 and the next day he was claimed off waivers by the Minnesota Wild. After playing the whole season there, he again found himself a free agent.

On July 4, 2006, Robitaille signed a one-year contract with the Philadelphia Flyers. He returned to the Islanders on December 20, 2006 along with a fifth round draft pick for Mike York. When unsigned at the beginning of the 2007–08 season, he chose to sign to play in Russia. After several games, he resigned from the Lokomotiv Yaroslavl team and was signed by the Ottawa Senators on October 16, 2007 for one season.

On August 23, 2008, Robitaille returned to Europe and signed as a free agent to a three-year contract with Swiss team HC Lugano.  After a disappointing campaign in 2008-09, Robitaille rebounded nicely in 2009-10, becoming the league's top scorer.  However, following a poor playoff performance in which HC Lugano was swept in the first round, Robitaille was informed in April 2010 he was no longer in the Club's future plans, despite him being under contract for the 2010-11 season.

He is not related in any way to former NHL players Luc Robitaille, Mike Robitaille or Louis Robitaille.

Career statistics

Awards and honours

References

External links
 

1975 births
Living people
Atlanta Thrashers players
Boston Bruins players
Canadian ice hockey centres
Franco-Ontarian people
HC Donbass players
HC Lugano players
Metallurg Novokuznetsk players
Ice hockey people from Ottawa
Lokomotiv Yaroslavl players
Los Angeles Kings players
Manchester Monarchs (AHL) players
Miami RedHawks men's ice hockey players
Milwaukee Admirals (IHL) players
Minnesota Wild players
Nashville Predators players
New York Islanders players
Ottawa Senators players
Philadelphia Flyers players
Pittsburgh Penguins players
Providence Bruins players
San Antonio Rampage players
Undrafted National Hockey League players
ZSC Lions players
Canadian expatriate ice hockey players in Ukraine
Canadian expatriate ice hockey players in Russia
Canadian expatriate ice hockey players in Switzerland
AHCA Division I men's ice hockey All-Americans